Harmes is a surname. Notable people with the surname include:

James Harmes (born 1995), Australian rules footballer
Suzanne Harmes (born 1986), Dutch gymnast
Wayne Harmes (born 1960), Australian rules footballer

See also
Harmer
Harms